Triongo is one of eleven parishes (administrative divisions) in Cangas de Onís, a municipality within the province and autonomous community of Asturias, by northern Spain's Picos de Europa mountains.

In 942, King Ramiro II of León donated to the bishop Vermudo of Oviedo the churches of San Vicente and Santa Eulalia of Triongo. This was written in a document conserved in the Archive of the Cathedral of Oviedo.

Villages
 Coviella
 Miyar
 Oliciu
 Triongu

References

Parishes in Cangas de Onis